Kimberly C. Hicks (born December 20, 1982) is an American politician serving in the Minnesota House of Representatives since 2023. A member of the Minnesota Democratic-Farmer-Labor Party (DFL), Hicks represents District 25A in southeastern Minnesota, which includes northern parts of the city of Rochester and parts of Olmsted County.

Early life, education and career 
Hicks' family moved to Rochester, Minnesota when she was a child and she graduated from Rochester Public Schools. She attended college at Winona State University, earning a bachelor's degree in education.

Minnesota House of Representatives 
Hicks was first elected to the Minnesota House of Representatives in 2022, after redistricting created a third Rochester-based House district. Hicks serves on the Children and Families Finance and Policy, Higher Education Finance and Policy, Human Services Finance, and Human Services Policy Committees.

Electoral history

Personal life 
Hicks lives in Rochester, Minnesota with her spouse, LaMar, and has five children.

References

External links 

Living people
1982 births
21st-century American politicians
21st-century American women politicians
Republican Party members of the Minnesota House of Representatives
Winona State University alumni
People from Rochester, Minnesota